Alycia Baumgardner (born 24 May 1994) is an American professional boxer. She has held the WBC and IBO female super featherweight titles since 2021, and the WBO, IBF, and The Ring female super featherweight titles since 2022. She became the undisputed female super featherweight champion of the world on February 5, 2023.

Personal life
Baumgardner's mother is of German, Japanese and Korean descent, while her father is African-American.

Professional career

Early career
Baumgardner made her professional debut against Britain Hart on March 4, 2017. She won the fight by a first-round technical knockout. Baumgardner notched her second win as a professional 22 days later, needing just 63 seconds to stop Wendy Toney. Her remaining two fights of the year ended just as fast, as she stopped Lashanda Tabron in 57 seconds on June 30, 2017, and Brittney Artis in 36 seconds on August 25, 2017.

Baumgardner faced Nydia Feliciano for the vacant WBC super featherweight title on February 10, 2018. She captured her first professional championship by unanimous decision. Baumgardner suffered her first loss as a professional in her first WBC International title defense, at the hands of Christina Linardatou on July 28, 2018.

Baumgardner faced Gabriella Mezei on May 10, 2019. She won the fight by a first-round technical knockout, her first stoppage victory in nearly two years. Baumgardner next faced Annette Pabello on November 2, 2019. She won the fight by unanimous decision. Baumgardner was then booked to face Cristina Del Valle Pacheco on December 14, 2019. She won the fight by another first-round technical knockout.

Unified super featherweight champion

Baumgardner vs. Harper
In October 2021, it was announced that Baumgardner would face WBC and IBO female super featherweight champion Terri Harper on 13 November 2021, Utilita Arena Sheffield. The fight was aired live on DAZN in the US and across the world as part of the undercard for Kiko Martinez vs. Kid Galahad. Baumgardner defeated Harper via a fourth round technical knockout. During the fight she dominated the second round and then caught Harper with a vicious right hand in the fourth, resulting in her going unbalanced with her whole body stiffened, which caused the referee to jump in to stop the bout. The referee was later praised by boxing pundits and fans for stepping in to stop the fight as Baumgardner had her hand in the air ready to pounce on Harper.

In December 2021, she signed a multi-fight promotional deal with Eddie Hearn's Matchroom Boxing. On 14 December 2021, her fourth round knockout against Terri Harper was adjudged as the 2021 Female Knockout of the Year by the World Boxing Council (WBC) as part of the WBC Best of the Year. In January 2021, it was also adjudged as Female Knockout of the Year by BoxingScene.com beating three others including Zulina Muñoz and Daniela Romina Bermúdez.

Baumgardner vs. Matthysse
In April 2022, Matchroom Boxing announced Baumgardner's first fight under the promotion to take place on 16 April against former former unified featherweight world champion Edith Soledad Matthysse at the Manchester Arena. The bout was her first title defense. The fight was televised live on DAZN as part of the undercard of Conor Benn's WBA continental title defense bout against Chris van Heerden. Baumgardner successfully retained her WBC and IBO titles via unanimous decision (UD), dominiating over ten rounds, with all three judges' scorecards reading 100–90.

Baumgardner vs. Mayer
In October 2022, Baumgardner cut and outpointed Mikaela Mayer to take the WBC, IBF and WBO titles; scores of two of the cards read 96-95 for Baumgardner, with the third card going to Mayer 97-93. Boxing analysts and former world champions Timothy Bradley and Andre Ward noted Baumgardner's fast start, athletic style, and strong finish that seemingly flustered Mayer. Boxing analyst and boxer Shawn Porter also reported on Baumgardner's noteworthy skillset after the "upset" victory. According to CompuBox stats, Baumgardner outlanded Mayer in total punches 116 to 104, was more efficient in her output landing 35% of punches to Mayer's 29%, and connected with significantly more power shots: Baumgardner landed 82 power shots, nearly doubling Mayer's 43.

Undisputed super featherweight champion

Baumgardner vs. Mekhaled
On November 15, 2022, the WBA ordered their junior lightweight champion Choi Hyun-mi to face Baumgardner in a title unification bout. Choi withdrew from the negotiations on December 13, which led to her being declared a "champion-in-recess" by the sanctioning body, due to her declared injury status. Baumgardner instead faced the next highest ranked WBA contender Elhem Mekhaled for the now vacant championship. The vacant title bout took place on February 4, 2023, at the Hulu Theater in New York City and was broadcast by DAZN. Baumgardner twice knocked Mekhaled down in the third round, en-route to winning the fight by unanimous decision, with two scorecards of 99–89 and one scorecard of 98–90.

Professional boxing record

References

External links

 

|-

|-

|-

|-

1994 births
Living people
American women boxers
Boxers from Ohio
African-American boxers
African-American sportswomen
American people of German descent
American sportspeople of Japanese descent
American sportspeople of Korean descent
World super-featherweight boxing champions
World Boxing Council champions
International Boxing Organization champions
International Boxing Federation champions
World Boxing Organization champions
World Boxing Association champions
The Ring (magazine) champions
21st-century American women